1995–96 Ukrainian First League was the fifth season of the Ukrainian First League which was easily won by Vorskla Poltava. The season started on August 4, 1995, and finished on July 1, 1996.

Promotion and relegation

Promoted teams
Two clubs promoted from the 1994–95 Ukrainian Second League.
 FC Yavir Krasnopillia – champion (debut)
 FC Lviv – 2nd place (debut)

Relegated teams 
Two clubs were relegated from the 1994-95 Ukrainian Top League:
 FC Temp Shepetivka – 18th place (returning after two seasons)
 FC Veres Rivne – 18th place (returning after three seasons)

Renamed teams
 FC Bazhanovets Makiivka was renamed to FC Shakhtar Makiivka before the season
 FC Temp Shepetivka merged with FC Advis Khmelnytskyi before the season and was renamed to FC Temp-Advis Khmelnytskyi

Teams
In 1995-96 season, the Ukrainian First League consists of the following teams:

Final table

Note:FC Temp Shepetivka at first united with FC Advis Khmelnytskyi. At winter break the club withdrew and was dissolved. To save the situation in the place of former Temp there was formed completely new team out of random amateur players based in Kamyanets-Podilskyi was given the name of Ratusha. The club folded at the end of the season.

Top scorers 
Statistics are taken from here.

References

Ukrainian First League seasons
2
Ukra